Miloš Radulović (born 23 February 1990) is a Montenegrin footballer who plays as a defender for OFK Grbalj.

He played with FK Napredak Kruševac in the 2014–15 Serbian SuperLiga, before moving to FK Mladost Podgorica.

References

External links
 Miloš Radulović stats at footballdatabase.eu

1990 births
Living people
Footballers from Podgorica
Association football fullbacks
Montenegrin footballers
Montenegro under-21 international footballers
FK Zeta players
FK Bratstvo Cijevna players
FK Mornar players
FK Napredak Kruševac players
OFK Titograd players
FK Sutjeska Nikšić players
OFK Grbalj players
Montenegrin First League players
Montenegrin Second League players
Serbian SuperLiga players
Montenegrin expatriate footballers
Expatriate footballers in Serbia
Montenegrin expatriate sportspeople in Serbia